Andromeda most commonly refers to:
 Andromeda (mythology), a princess from Greek mythology
 Andromeda (constellation), a region of the Earth's night sky
 The Andromeda Galaxy, an astronomical object within the constellation

Andromeda may also refer to:

Artistic works

Fine art 
 Andromeda Chained to the Rocks, a 1631 painting by Rembrandt
 Andromeda (Rodin), an 1889 sculpture by Auguste Rodin

Literature 
 Andromeda (play), lost mythological tragedy by Euripides from 412 BC
 Andromeda (novel), 1957 science fiction novel by Ivan Yefremov
 The Andromeda Strain, 1969 techno-thriller novel by Michael Crichton
 The Andromeda Evolution, 2019 science fiction novel by Daniel H. Wilson, sequel to The Andromeda Strain

Music
 Andromeda (English band), a 1960s psychedelic rock band from Britain, or their eponymous debut album
 Andromeda (Swedish band), a 2000s progressive metal band from Sweden
 Love Outside Andromeda, a 2000s indie rock band from Australia, initially simply, Andromeda
 "Andromeda", a 2019 song by Weyes Blood from Titanic Rising
 "Andromeda", a song by the death metal band Dethklok, from the 2012 album Dethalbum III
 Andromeda, 1982 album by Harry Thumann
 "Andromeda" (Gorillaz song)
 "Andromeda" (Elodie song)
 "Andromeda", a song by Chicane from Behind the Sun
 "Andromeda", a song by Canadian rock band Zuckerbaby
 Andromeda, 1905 dramatic cantata for soloists, chorus and orchestra by English composer Cyril Rootham
 Andromeda, 1886 cantata for the Three Choirs Festival by English composer Charles Harford Lloyd
 "Andromède", 1883 symphonic poem written by French composer Augusta Holmès

Other artistic works
 Andromeda (TV series), science fiction series created by Gene Roddenberry
 Mass Effect: Andromeda, the fourth installment in the main Mass Effect series released in 2017

Fictional characters
 Andromeda (Marvel Comics), female, Atlantian, mermaid-like character in the Marvel Universe
 Andromeda (Pantheon), more obscure, female Marvel Comics character
 Andromeda Shun, male Bronze Saint character in the Saint Seiya universe
 Andromeda Tonks, a character in the Harry Potter series of novels and films
 Laurel Gand, female Legion of Super-Heroes member in the DC Comics Universe
 Andromeda, a female character in the 2011 first-person shooter video game Conduit 2

Botany
 Andromeda (plant) (bog rosemary), a small, slender shrub native to Northern peat bogs
 Colloquially, Pieris (fetterbushes), several large, broad-leafed, mountain shrubs

People
 Andromeda (wrestler), Mexican professional wrestler
 Andromeda Dunker, narrator of House Hunters

Ships
 HMS Andromeda, several warships of the Royal Navy
 Andromeda (1819), a 408-ton English ship

Other uses
 Andromeda (wine), produced by California winemaker Sean Thackrey
 Andromeda (Chinese astronomy)

See also
 A for Andromeda, a 1961 BBC television science fiction drama serial written by Fred Hoyle and John Elliot
 The Andromeda Breakthrough, a 1962 BBC sequel to the 1961 serial
 A come Andromeda, a 1971 Italian remake of the 1961 serial
 A for Andromeda (2006 film), a BBC remake of the 1961 serial
 Andromeda Software Development, a Greek demogroup
 
 Andromache (disambiguation)